The 2001–02 Maryland Terrapins men's basketball team represented the University of Maryland in the 2001–2002 college basketball season as a member of the Atlantic Coast Conference (ACC). The team was led by head coach Gary Williams and played their home games at Cole Field House. The Terrapins were champions of the 2002 NCAA Division I men's basketball tournament, earning the first national championship in school history.

Preseason

Accolades
Team
ESPN/USA Today Coaches' poll ranked preseason #2

Roster

Depth chart

Season recap

Accolades
Lonny Baxter
Wooden Award All-American Team
NCAA West Regional Most Outstanding Player
Second Team All-ACC

Juan Dixon
AP First Team All-American
USBWA First Team All-American
Wooden Award All-American Team
Chip Hilton Player of the Year Award
Senior CLASS Award
ACC Player of the Year
First Team All-ACC

Gary Williams
ACC Coach of the Year
Eastern College Coach of the Year

Schedule

|-
!colspan=9 style="background:#CE1126; color:#FFFFFF;"| Exhibition

|-
!colspan=9 style="background:#CE1126; color:#FFFFFF;"| Regular Season

|-
!colspan=9 style="background:#CE1126; color:#FFFFFF;"|ACC Tournament

|-
!colspan=9 style="background:#CE1126; color:#FFFFFF;"|NCAA tournament

Statistics

References

External links
https://web.archive.org/web/20090206225040/http://umterps.cstv.com/sports/m-baskbl/archive/md-m-baskbl-2001.html

NCAA Division I men's basketball tournament championship seasons
NCAA Division I men's basketball tournament Final Four seasons
Maryland Terrapins men's basketball seasons
Maryland
Maryland
Maryland
Maryland